The Museum of Central Finland (Finnish: Keski-Suomen museo, also known colloquially as KeMu) is a museum of cultural history located in Jyväskylä, the capital of the Central Finland region. It serves as the regional museum for Central Finland, as well as the municipal museum of the City of Jyväskylä.

Architecture
The present building, notable for having been designed by the Finnish architect Alvar Aalto, was completed in 1960. In 2017–2020, the museum was extensively renovated, including the addition of 80 digital information displays and numerous interactive audiovisual exhibits.

The Museum of Central Finland is located adjacent to the Alvar Aalto Museum. Plans are underway to connect the two museums with a new wing, estimated to open in late 2023.

Statistics
The museum was established in 1932.

It has  of exhibition space.

In 2019, the museum received over 11,700 visitors.

References

External links

Museums in Finland
Museums in Central Finland
Buildings and structures in Jyväskylä
Buildings and structures in Central Finland
Alvar Aalto buildings
Modernist architecture in Finland
Museums established in 1932